is a monorail station on the Osaka Monorail located in Suita, Osaka, Japan.
It serves as the station for the Expo Commemoration Park. It is also the transfer station from the Main Line to the Saito Line, acting as the Saito Line terminus.

Lines
Osaka Monorail
Main Line (Station Number: 17)
Saito Line (Station Number: 17)

Layout
There are two island platforms.  Platforms 1 and 4 are for the Main Line, whereas 2 and 3 are for the Saito Line.

Adjacent stations

References

Osaka Monorail stations
Railway stations in Japan opened in 1990